The men's 800 metres event at the 2021 European Athletics Indoor Championships was held on 5 March 2021 at 19:55 (heats), on 6 March 2019 at 19:25 (semi-finals), and on 7 March at 18:25 (final) local time.

Medalists

Records

Results

Heats
Qualification: First 3 in each heat (Q) advance to the Semifinals.

Semifinals
Qualification: First 2 in each heat (Q) advance to the Final.

Final

References

2021 European Athletics Indoor Championships
800 metres at the European Athletics Indoor Championships